Jericho Vincent is an American author and speaker. They are best known for their books, Cut Me Loose and Legends of the Talmud.

Early life and education
Jericho Vincent was raised in Pittsburgh, Pennsylvania, by a Jewish family. They were a student at Brooklyn College from 2002 to 2007. They graduated from Harvard's John F. Kennedy School of Government with a Master of Public Policy degree as a Pforzheimer Fellow in 2009.

Career

In their 2014 memoir, Cut Me Loose: Sin and Salvation After My Ultra-Orthodox Girlhood, Vincent describes their own experience leaving the Haredi Jewish community, and how they came to lead a self-determined life. They were named one of Jewish Week’s 36 Under 36 in 2014.

Vincent is an advocate for "reform" within the Haredi Jewish community. They have spoken out on issues of abuse in the religious community.

Vincent is both a member and a board member of Footsteps, an organization that serves former Haredi Jews who seek to enter or explore the world beyond the Jewish communities in which they were raised.
Their essays calling for reform have been published by the Huffington Post, Unpious, and Zeek. 
In July 2013, in partnership with Footsteps and the UJA-Federation of New York, Vincent co-ordinated and hosted an event with a panel of rabbis from across the spectrum of progressive Jewish communities; the title of the event was "Beyond Romanticization and Vilification". Vincent's speech and the ensuing panel discussion were broadcast by Shalom TV.

In 2016, Vincent participated in a project called Real Women Real Stories founded by Matan Uziel.

In 2019, Vincent came out as non-binary, and changed their first name to "Jericho".

Publications 
Cut Me Loose: Sin and Salvation After My Ultra-Orthodox Girlhood, New York: Nan A. Talese / Doubleday, January 2014,

References

External links 
Jericho Vincent's Website

1982 births
Living people
Jewish American writers
Brooklyn College alumni
Harvard Kennedy School alumni
Writers from Pittsburgh
21st-century American memoirists
Religious autobiographies
Orthodox Judaism in the United States
American religious writers
American social activists
American bloggers
American women memoirists
American women bloggers
21st-century American women
Former Orthodox Jews
21st-century American Jews